Nachchaduwa wewa (Also known as Mahadaragala Reservoir) is a reservoir near Thammannakulama, Sri Lanka.
The reservoir is used to store water brings from Kala Wewa through Yoda Ela channel. The reservoir was severely damaged in 1957 flood and the restoration of the tank was completed in 1958.

History
This tank is believed to be one of the sixteen large reservoirs built by King Mahasen (277 – 304). It is said that he built this tank to supply water to the city and to safeguard the city from floods. However the chronicle Mahavamsa have made a reference to this reservoir during the time of King Moggallana II (540 - 560).

References 

Reservoirs in Sri Lanka
Lakes of Sri Lanka